Lake Buddha is a large proglacial lake on the south margin of Joyce Glacier in the small valley known as Shangri-la. It was named in association with Shangri-la by the New Zealand Victoria University of Wellington Antarctic Expedition, 1960–61.

See also
Mount Steep

References
 

Lakes of Victoria Land
Scott Coast